Puppet Master: Axis of Evil (also known as Puppet Master 9: Axis of Evil ) is a 2010 American action horror film directed by David DeCoteau,  it is the ninth official entry into the Puppet Master series of horror films.

Plot
The film begins at the Bodega Bay Inn, 1939. Danny Coogan (Levi Fiehler) is making wooden chairs for a wedding reception for his Uncle Len, who owns the Inn. Danny tells his uncle that if it was not for his limp, he would be able to go to war, along with his brother Don, and tells his Uncle that he's going to help André Toulon. Toulon is guest at the inn, whose wife was killed by the Nazis because they wanted a formula, a formula that allows his puppets to come alive. After escaping from Berlin to Geneva, Toulon came to America to hide from the Nazis. As Danny's heading over to Toulon's room, he hears a gunshot and goes to see what happened. Two men dressed in black leaving Toulon's room push Danny aside, and as they leave, he manages to get a glimpse at one of their faces. He enters the room and finds Toulon dead with a gun in his hand. Danny, to whom Toulon showed his puppets, grabs them out of a wall panel and finds that all the puppets are still there, along with unanimated Six Shooter and another puppet, named Ninja.

The next day, Danny goes to visit his mother, Elma and his brother Don. Don is being shipped off to war the following week. Meanwhile, the two Nazi assassins, Klaus and Max, are heading to an Opera House in Chinatown, under orders from The Führer, where they meet a Japanese saboteur named Ozu (Ada Zhou Fang). She tells them that she's under orders from The Emperor, which are for her and the Nazis to work together to take out an American bomb manufacturing plant, destroying America's war efforts. To obtain this goal, it requires Max to go undercover and pretend to be of American descent and work at the plant, and to get close to the girl who runs the plant's office, Beth (Jenna Gallagher), who is coincidentally Danny's girlfriend. The next day, after bringing the puppets to life, Danny walks into the plant to show them to Beth, and sees Max there. Recognizing him as one of the assassins, he tries to warn Beth away from him, but she doesn't believe him.

After Max leaves the plant, Danny follows him back to the Opera House, and uncovers their plan. Danny is seen by Max, and quickly leaves. Max calls the Bodega Bay Inn to find out where he lives and sends Klaus to Danny's mother's place where Elma and Beth are planning a bon voyage party for Don. Klaus shoots Elma, and kidnaps Beth, and also shoots Don when he unexpectedly comes home. Danny comes home to find Don bleeding to death, and after telling him what happened, thanks to Toulon's diary, puts his brother's soul into Ninja's body. Danny and the puppets head out to the opera house to get Beth. Tunneler and Leech Woman kill Ozu's men and Ninja and Pinhead kill Klaus. Danny saves Beth, but Ozu badly hurts Ninja, so Danny and Blade threaten Ozu with the active bomb to back off, which is taken by Max, and deactivated it. Ninja, with what little left of life he has, stabs Ozu's sword into his back killing him. Ozu takes off with Tunneler and supposedly Jester and Leech Woman inside the bag, leaving behind Blade, Pinhead, and the mortally wounded Ninja. Danny swears that Ozu has a war coming to her.

Cast

Promotion
In late 2009, a teaser trailer was released.

Release
Puppet Master: Axis of Evil was released on July 27, 2010.  Upon its release, Full Moon also released Puppet Master: Axis of Evil in a collector's set with the original Puppet Master in its original widescreen format on June 15. The set includes packaging resembling Toulon's trunk, a poster for Axis of Evil, mini-poster cards for all of the films in the series, and stickers featuring each puppet. The set is available on DVD and Blu-ray, marking Full Moon's first foray into the Blu-ray market, including both the original Puppet Master and Axis of Evil.

References

External links
 

2010 films
2010 horror films
Puppet Master (film series)
Full Moon Features films
Puppet films
2010s supernatural horror films
American World War II films
Films set in 1939
American action horror films
Films directed by David DeCoteau
2010s English-language films
2010s American films